Nirley da Silva Fonseca (born 9 April 1988), simply known as Nirley, is a Brazilian footballer who plays as a centre back for Confiança.

Career 
Nirley first played for Americano in Campeonato Carioca. His breakthrough came in 2011 when he moved to Criciúma, and made his national league debut on 15 June 2011 against ASA in a Campeonato Brasileiro Série B match. His debut game saw him pick up an injury, and he spent almost three months on the sidelines.

At the start of 2013, Nirley was loaned to Cruzeiro, but a lack of game-time saw him recalled and sign for Figueirense, initially on loan for the rest of 2013, but eventually on a three-year deal.

Nirley signed with Náutico for the 2017 season. He moved to Brasil de Pelotas in August 2017.

References

External links

Football Database profile

1988 births
Living people
Brazilian footballers
Campeonato Brasileiro Série A players
Campeonato Brasileiro Série B players
Criciúma Esporte Clube players
Cruzeiro Esporte Clube players
Figueirense FC players
Americano Futebol Clube players
Clube Náutico Capibaribe players
Grêmio Esportivo Brasil players
Association football defenders
Sportspeople from Rio de Janeiro (state)